Notre Dame Catholic College is a Catholic secondary school and sixth form in Everton, Liverpool, England. Founded by the Sisters of Notre Dame de Namur, it was a girls' school for most of its history but became coeducational from September 2012.

Admissions
The College became coeducational from September 2012, admitting boys into Year 7 for the first time. Boys were already undertaking Sixth Form education at Notre Dame Catholic College.

History
It was founded in February 1869. The Notre Dame Catholic College was originally the residence of the Sisters of Notre Dame in Liverpool, and began as a pupil-teacher centre with links to local primary schools. The collegiate school did not actually come into existence until 1902, with this merging with the pupil teacher centre in 1908.

Direct grant grammar school
It was known as Notre Dame Collegiate School at Everton Valley, and became a direct grant grammar school in 1946 as a result of the Education Act 1944.

Comprehensive
The sisters did not move out of the building until 1978 due to the expansion and the intake of the school building, and the school building also followed this expansion to pave the way for the institution to become an all-girls comprehensive school in 1983, which also tallied with the amalgamation of both St John's Secondary Modern School and St Catherine's Secondary Modern School to form Notre Dame High School in the same year.

In 2001, the school inserted the word 'Catholic' into its title to become Notre Dame Catholic High School, but 2002 saw the school become a specialist 'Performing Arts College' – returning the institution to a College as it once originally was.

The former all girls College started to accept boys into Year 7 from September 2012. Boys are already enrolled into Sixth Form. From September 2012, the royal blue uniform will change to all grey.

In September 2013, the College moved to a new, state-of-the-art building next to Everton Park sports centre on Great Homer Street as part of the wider Project Jennifer scheme. Construction began on the new building in July 2012.

On 2 September 2014 part of the old Notre Dame building was set a light. The fire started in the old sports hall.

Academic performance
The College achieved a 100% A-Level pass rate in 2010/2011 and will be enrolling girls and boys from September 2012.

Notable former pupils

Notre Dame Collegiate School

 Lyn Andrews, author
 Dame Colette Bowe, Chairman from March 2009 – April 2014 of Ofcom
 Prof Yvonne Carter CBE, Dean from 2004 to 2009 of Warwick Medical School
 Jackie Downey, actress who starred in The Brothers McGregor
 Kate Fitzgerald, actress who played Doreen Corkhill, wife of Billy Corkhill, from 1985 to 1989 in Brookside
 Kate McCann, general practitioner and mother of Madeleine McCann
 Joan MacNaughton CB, President from 2011 to 2013 of the Energy Institute, who married Sir Bill Jeffrey (Permanent Secretary at the MoD) in 1979
 Mary Mulligan, Labour MSP from 1999 to 2011 for Linlithgow
 Margaret Murphy, author (nee Wright)
 Dr Mary Parke, phycologist at the Marine Biological Association
 Winifred Robinson, presenter since 2000 of You and Yours on BBC Radio 4
 Margaret Wall, Baroness Wall of New Barnet (nee Mylott), Chair of the Labour Party from 2001 to 2002
 Joan Walmsley, Baroness Walmsley, wife of Martin Thomas, Baron Thomas of Gresford (both Lib-Dem peers)

See also
 Notre Dame High School, Glasgow
 Notre Dame High School, Sheffield
 Notre Dame Roman Catholic Girls' School

References

External links
 School website
 EduBase

1902 establishments in England
Secondary schools in Liverpool
Educational institutions established in 1902
Girls' schools in Merseyside
Catholic secondary schools in the Archdiocese of Liverpool
Sisters of Notre Dame de Namur schools
Voluntary aided schools in England